Eric Snowden (August 8, 1888 – June 27, 1979) was an English-born actor who appeared in radio, films and television.

Biography
Snowden was born in London, England, on August 8, 1888. He died in Bellevue, Washington, on June 27, 1979.

Radio
Snowden was part of the cast of, among others, The New Adventures of Sherlock Holmes (1949–1950, as Dr. Watson), The Burns and Allen Show (1932–1950), Encore Theater (1946–1949), Escape (1947–1954), and Favorite Story (1946–1949).

Film
Snowden appeared in the movies The Lion Man (1936), The Sun Never Sets (1939), and The Man Who Knew Too Much (1956) (uncredited).

Television
Snowden appeared in two Leave It to Beaver first-season episodes, as well as many other programs.

References

External links

1888 births
1979 deaths
English male radio actors
English male film actors
English male television actors
Male actors from London
20th-century English male actors
British emigrants to the United States